Hugh Burns (20 December 1894 – 1963) was a Scottish footballer who played as a centre-half for several clubs including Rochdale and Dumbarton.

References

1894 births
1963 deaths
People from Bonhill
Footballers from West Dunbartonshire
Association football central defenders
Scottish footballers
Rochdale A.F.C. players
Oldham Athletic A.F.C. players
St Anthony's F.C. players
Dumbarton Harp F.C. players
Rutherglen Glencairn F.C. players
Dumbarton F.C. players
Renton F.C. players
East Stirlingshire F.C. players